Patricia Price is managing director and co-founder of the global public relations and digital marketing firm 8VA Music Consultancy. Price was previously the executive director of Portland Piano International and the Classical Product Manager for Allegro Media Group managing classical record labels.

Career
Price studied at Willamette University where she received her Bachelor of Music in piano performance and Bachelor of Arts in philosophy in 2004. After graduating she was awarded a Fulbright Assistantship to study and work in Vienna, Austria for one year. After her return, Price worked at Allegro Media group for five years where she managed the classical division and acted as executive producer for over 75 albums. She received her MBA from Willamette in 2009 and that same year became Executive Director of Portland Piano International, a non-profit organization which presents recitals featuring pianists such as Murray Perahia and Vladimir Feltsman, in addition to providing master classes.

In 2012, Price founded 8VA Music Consultancy (previously the New York branch of Inverne Price Music Consultancy) with James Inverne. 8VA is global public relations and digital marketing firm for classical musicians and organizations whose clients include Lang Lang, Anne Akiko Meyers, Beijing Music Festival, and Shanghai Symphony Orchestra. She manages the company with her husband, Matt Herman. In December 2018, The New York Observer named 8VA one of "The Most Powerful Entertainment and Media PR Firms of 2018."

In January 2019, Price was a featured "Inspired Woman" in clothing brand J.Jill's Rhythm & Blues campaign.

References

Year of birth missing (living people)
Living people
American women classical pianists
American classical pianists
Willamette University alumni
21st-century American women